The 1973 Rothmans International Quebec, also known as the Quebec International Open, was a men's professional tennis tournament that was part of Group B of the 1973 Grand Prix tennis circuit. It was held on indoor carpet courts at the Laval University sports centre in Quebec City, Quebec in Canada. It was the third and last edition of the tournament and was held from 2 October through 7 October 1973. Jimmy Connors won the singles title and earned $9,000 first-prize money.

Finals

Singles
 Jimmy Connors defeated  Marty Riessen 6–1, 6–3, 6–7, 6–0
 It was Connors' 10th singles title of the year and the 16th of his career.

Doubles
 Bob Carmichael /  Frew McMillan defeated  Jimmy Connors /  Marty Riessen 6–2, 7–6

References

External links
 ITF tournament edition details

Quebec WCT Tournament
Tennis in Canada
1973 in Canadian tennis